Dilsukhnagar is one of the largest commercial and residential centers in Hyderabad. It was once part of the Municipal Corporation of Hyderabad, but later merged with the Greater Hyderabad Municipal Corporation.

History 
The name "Dilsukhnagar" is derived from Dilsukh Ramprasad, an agricultural land owner who lived around Malakpet. It is said that he subdivided his land into plots and built a colony which he named Dilsukhnagar.

Dilsukhnagar was once a purely residential suburb; however, in the last decade strong economic growth has transformed it into a major commercial hub.

Administration 
Dilsukhnagar was merged into the Greater Hyderabad Municipal Corporation in 2007 after an order passed by the Government of Telangana. It is now a part of the Telangana State Assembly.

Transport
The suburb houses a Telangana State Road Transport Corporation bus depot.

Multi-Modal Transport System station in Malakpet serves Dilsukhnagar.
It is well connected by Hyderabad Metro

Incidents 
The locality has been subject to terrorist attacks twice in its history. Both cases involved attacks using a time bomb. The first incident happened in 2002, allegedly planted by SIMI, investigation of which is underway. The second incident involving twin blasts occurred in 2013, killing 13 people while injuring 83 others. Death toll enhanced to 17 in the ensuing days. Members of Indian Mujahideen, a terrorist group, were eventually convicted for their role in the blasts.

References 

Neighbourhoods in Hyderabad, India